The Convention on the Non-Applicability of Statutory Limitations to War Crimes and Crimes Against Humanity was adopted and opened for signature, ratification and accession by United Nations General Assembly resolution 2391 (XXIII) of 26 November 1968.
Pursuant to the provisions of its Article VIII (90 days following the deposit of the tenth ratification), it came into force on 11 November 1970.

The Convention provides that no signatory state may apply statutory limitations to:
War crimes as they are defined in the Charter of the Nürnberg International Military Tribunal of 8 August 1945.
Crimes against humanity, whether committed in time of war or in time of peace, as defined in the Charter of the Nürnberg International Military Tribunal, eviction by armed attack or occupation, inhuman acts resulting from the policy of apartheid, and the crime of genocide as defined in the 1948 Convention on the Prevention and Punishment of the Crime of Genocide.

As of December 2020, with the adhesion of Ecuador, the convention has 56 state parties, which includes 55 UN member states and the State of Palestine.

Member states
 Signatories
 , signed on 16/12/1968, ratified on 14/02/1969
 , signed on 06/01/1969, ratified on 22/04/1969
 , signed on 07/01/1969, ratified on 08/05/1969
 , signed on 21/01/1969, ratified on 21/05/1969
 , signed on 31/01/1969, ratified on 21/05/1969
 , signed on 14/01/1969, ratified on 19/06/1969
 , signed on 25/03/1969, ratified on 24/06/1969
 , signed on 17/04/1969, ratified on 15/09/1969
  Ex Yugoslavia, signed on 16/12/1968, ratified on 09/06/1970
  Ex Czechoslovakia, signed on 21/05/1969, ratified on 13/08/1970
 , signed on 03/07/1969, ratified on 15/03/2002
 Adherents
 , adhered on 01/12/1970
 , adhered on 12/01/1971
 , adhered on 19/05/1971
 , adhered on 07/06/1971
 , adhered on 01/05/1972
 , adhered on 15/06/1972
 , adhered on 13/09/1972
 , adhered on 06/10/1972
 , adhered on 15/05/1973
 , adhered on 16/04/1975
 , adhered on 29/12/1978
 , adhered on 09/11/1981
 , adhered on 06/05/1983
 , adhered on 22/07/1983
 , adhered on 06/10/1983
 , adhered on 08/11/1984
 , adhered on 28/12/1984
 , adhered on 03/09/1986
 , adhered on 09/02/1987
 , adhered on 16/05/1989
 , adhered on 21/10/1991
 , adhered on 14/04/1992
 , adhered on 06/07/1992
 , adhered on 12/10/1992
 , adhered on 26/01/1993
 , adhered on 22/02/1993
 , adhered on 28/05/1993
 , adhered on 23/06/1993
 , adhered on 01/09/1993
 , adhered on 18/01/1994
 , adhered on 07/03/1995
 , adhered on 31/03/1995
 , adhered on 01/02/1996
 , adhered on 16/08/1996
 , adhered on 07/09/2000
 , adhered on 12/03/2001
 , adhered on 21/09/2001
 , adhered on 11/08/2003
 , adhered on 26/08/2003
 , adhered on 16/09/2005
 , adhered on 23/10/2006
 , adhered on 21/06/2007
 , adhered on 23/09/2008
 , adhered on 27/04/2009
 , adhered on 16/08/2010
 , adhered on 02/01/2015
 , adhered on 01/12/2020

Notes

External links
Convention text (UNHCHR)
Convention text UNITED NATIONS
Signatories and ratifications 
 Procedural history and related documents on the Convention on the Non-Applicability of Statutory Limitations to War Crimes and Crimes against Humanity in the Historic Archives of the United Nations Audiovisual Library of International Law

Human rights instruments
International criminal law treaties
International humanitarian law treaties
Statutes of limitations
Treaties concluded in 1968
Treaties entered into force in 1970
War crimes
Crimes against humanity
Genocide
Treaties of the Democratic Republic of Afghanistan
Treaties of the People's Socialist Republic of Albania
Treaties of Argentina
Treaties of Armenia
Treaties of Azerbaijan
Treaties of the Byelorussian Soviet Socialist Republic
Treaties of Bolivia
Treaties of Bosnia and Herzegovina
Treaties of the People's Republic of Bulgaria
Treaties of Cameroon
Treaties of Costa Rica
Treaties of Croatia
Treaties of the Czech Republic
Treaties of Czechoslovakia
Treaties of North Korea
Treaties of Estonia
Treaties of the Gambia
Treaties of Georgia (country)
Treaties of Ghana
Treaties of Guinea
Treaties of Honduras
Treaties of the Hungarian People's Republic
Treaties of India
Treaties of Kenya
Treaties of Kuwait
Treaties of Laos
Treaties of Latvia
Treaties of Liberia
Treaties of Lithuania
Treaties of the Libyan Arab Jamahiriya
Treaties of Mexico
Treaties of the Mongolian People's Republic
Treaties of Montenegro
Treaties of Nigeria
Treaties of Nicaragua
Treaties of the State of Palestine
Treaties of Panama
Treaties of Paraguay
Treaties of Peru
Treaties of the Philippines
Treaties of the Polish People's Republic
Treaties of Moldova
Treaties of the Socialist Republic of Romania
Treaties of the Soviet Union
Treaties of Rwanda
Treaties of Serbia and Montenegro
Treaties of Slovakia
Treaties of Slovenia
Treaties of Saint Vincent and the Grenadines
Treaties of North Macedonia
Treaties of Tunisia
Treaties of the Ukrainian Soviet Socialist Republic
Treaties of Uruguay
Treaties of Vietnam
Treaties of South Yemen
Treaties of Yugoslavia
Treaties of Cuba